Leeds Student Radio (also known as LSR and formerly as LSRfm.com) is a student radio station broadcasting every day during term time from Leeds University Union at the University of Leeds. It is also the official student radio station for Leeds Trinity University and Leeds College of Music. The station broadcasts online through its website.

With over 330 members, Leeds Student Radio is one of the largest student radio stations in the country. The station is run by an elected committee of student volunteers, and the management of the station is overseen by a full-time station manager employed by Leeds University Union.  The station also provides live DJs for venues within Leeds University Union and the City of Leeds.

Formation 

In the 1970s a group of students formed 'Network 4' and broadcast black-and-white programmes on a closed circuit around the university. However, when this became too costly and time-consuming to continue, the students decided to broadcast radio instead, and Network 4 became Leeds Student Radio. In the late 1990s, TV presenter Anita Rani worked at the radio station.

Studios 

The station has a permanent office on the first floor of Leeds University Union which overlooks the main entrance to the Union. There are two studios, one that broadcasts live and a production studio.

Content 

The Leeds Student Radio schedule consists of several core shows and individually-run shows which members can apply for each semester. The schedule is determined for Semester 1 in September and Semester 2 in January by the station manager, the programme controller and the core show editors. Antonia Quirke, writing in the New Statesman, described the on air content as "[an] easy joy in the medium" and celebrated the individual DJs and their programmes.

Station managers 

As a result of the SAR (Student Activity Review) carried out by Leeds University Union, since 2007 the Station Manager of Leeds Student Radio has been an appointed post rather than an elected one, with candidates facing an interview panel.

The application process consists of a presentation from the candidates, followed by a question-and-answer session, which all members of Leeds Student Radio are welcome to attend. This is followed by an interview with the panel. The first manager selected using this process was Richard Andrews.

See also 
Student Radio Association
Student Radio Awards
Leeds Student Television
The Gryphon

Notes and references

External links 
This is LSR website
Leeds University Union

University of Leeds
Leeds Beckett University
Student radio in the United Kingdom
Clubs and societies of the University of Leeds
Radio stations in Yorkshire